New Beginning was the debut and only solo studio album released by Irish singer-songwriter and Boyzone singer, Stephen Gately. The album was released by Universal on 26 June 2000. The release marked his last official studio release, solo or with Boyzone, due to his death on 10 October 2009. The album peaked at number nine on the UK Albums Chart. Three singles were released from the album: "New Beginning", "I Believe" and "Stay".

Track listing

Notes
 signifies an additional producer

Charts

References

2000 debut albums
Polydor Records albums
Albums produced by Bloodshy & Avant
Albums produced by Steve Mac
Albums produced by Stargate
Albums produced by Carl Sturken and Evan Rogers